Ricardo Gonzalez may refer to:

 Ricardo González Alfonso (born 1950), Cuban journalist
 Ricardo González (footballer, born 1965), Chilean footballer
 Ricardo Primitivo González (born 1925), Argentina basketball player
 Ricardo González (bobsleigh) (1900–1947), Argentine bobsledder
 Ricardo González (golfer) (born 1969), Argentine golfer
 Ricardo González (footballer, born 1974), Costa Rican footballer
 Ricardo González (Paraguayan footballer) (born 1945)
 Ricardo González (racing driver) (born 1978), Mexican racing driver
 Ricardo González (rower) (born 1937), Argentine Olympic rower
 Ricardo González (swimmer) (born 1947), Colombian swimmer
 Ricardo Gonzalez (politician) (born 1946), American politician

See also
Ricardo Gonzales (disambiguation)